Nicholas Stuart Hagglund (born September 14, 1992) is an American professional soccer player who plays as a defender for FC Cincinnati in Major League Soccer.

Career

Xavier University 

Hagglund played four years of college soccer for the Xavier Musketeers. He made 81 appearances, starting in 80, while scoring four goals and adding 11 assists. Hagglund was named Big East Defensive Player of the Year for 2013, along with First Team All-Big East honors. During his collegiate career he has also earned Atlantic 10 Defensive Player honors, and was named to the Atlantic 10 All-Conference First Team. In his freshman campaign he was named to Atlantic 10 All-Rookie Team and Atlantic 10 All-Tournament Team.

Toronto FC 
On January 16, 2014 Hagglund was drafted in the first round (10th overall) of the 2014 MLS SuperDraft by Toronto FC.

Hagglund made his professional debut in a 2–0 win over the Columbus Crew on April 5, 2014.

On September 27, 2014 Hagglund scored his first 2 goals in a 3–2 come from behind home victory against the Portland Timbers.

In August 2015, Hagglund was temporarily loaned to Toronto's lower division USL club, Toronto FC II.

On November 30, 2016, Hagglund scored the goal that put Toronto FC ahead 3–2 against the Montreal Impact in the Eastern Conference Final. This tied the aggregate score at 5–5, and sent the game into extra time. Toronto FC went on to score 2 in extra time to win the game 5–2 and earn their first-ever appearance in the MLS Cup against Seattle Sounders FC.

FC Cincinnati
On January 23, 2019, Hagglund was traded to his hometown team FC Cincinnati ahead of their inaugural season in MLS. Cincinnati received the No. 24 Allocation Ranking and Hagglund from Toronto in exchange for $200,000 in General Allocation Money in 2019, $100,000 in Targeted Allocation Money in 2020 and the No. 1 Allocation Ranking. He scored his first goal for the club on October 14, 2020 against the Columbus Crew, scoring the winning goal on a header from a set piece in the 49th minute, to give Cincinnati their first ever win over their interstate rival.

Following the 2021 season, Cincinnati declined their contract option on Hagglund. He re-signed with the team on January 14, 2022.

Career statistics

Honors 
Toronto FC:
 MLS Cup: 2017
 Supporters' Shield: 2017
 Eastern Conference Winners (Playoffs): 2016, 2017
 Canadian Championship: 2016, 2017
 Trillium Cup: 2016, 2017

Individual
 Big East Defensive Player of the Year: 2013
All-Big East First Team: 2013

References

External links 
 

1992 births
Living people
American soccer players
American expatriate soccer players
FC Cincinnati players
Xavier Musketeers men's soccer players
Toronto FC players
Toronto FC II players
Association football defenders
Soccer players from Cincinnati
Toronto FC draft picks
Expatriate soccer players in Canada
Major League Soccer players
USL Championship players